Jean-Christophe Rouvière (born 4 August 1974, in Montpellier) is a retired French football midfielder. He last played for Championnat National side Nîmes Olympique.

His previous clubs include Montpellier HSC, FC Girondins de Bordeaux and Toulouse FC.

References

1974 births
Living people
French footballers
Montpellier HSC players
FC Girondins de Bordeaux players
Toulouse FC players
Nîmes Olympique players
Ligue 1 players
Ligue 2 players
Championnat National players

Association football midfielders